Frankie and Johnny (also known as Frankie and Johnnie) is a 1936 American film.

The film was shot on location in The Bronx, New York and sat on the shelf for two years before being released by the studio due to interference from United States film censors.

Synopsis
The story of a maidenly woman, Frankie, and Johnnie, the man "who done her wrong."

Cast
 Helen Morgan as Frankie
 Chester Morris as Johnny Drew
 Lilyan Tashman as Nellie Bly

References

External links

1936 films
1936 drama films
American drama films
American black-and-white films
1930s English-language films
Films scored by Victor Young
Films set in New York City
Films shot in New York City
Republic Pictures films
1930s American films